Melitaea trivia, the lesser spotted fritillary, is a butterfly of the family Nymphalidae, part of the sub-family Nymphalinae.

Distribution 
It is found in the southern part of the Palearctic realm. In Europe it is sometimes called the desert fritillary, but this name also refers to the North African relative M. deserticola.

It was first described in 1775 by entomologists Michael Denis and Ignaz Schiffermüller under the basionym Papilio trivia.

Description 
The wingspan is 15–23 mm. At first sight it is somewhat similar to Melitaea didyma but the black lunules before the margin united and the disc traversed by a strongly flexuose macular band, the hindwing with abundant, connected, black markings on the disc. The female with the ground-colour centrally more or less pale, especially on the forewing.

Biology 
The larvae feed on Verbascum species.

Sub-species 
 Melitaea trivia catapelia Staudinger, 1886
 Melitaea trivia caucasi Verity, 1922
 Melitaea trivia chorosana Shchetkin, 1984
 Melitaea trivia fascelis (Esper, 1783) – in the south of Europe
 Melitaea trivia ignasiti Sagarra, 1926 – in the Iberian Peninsula. This taxon tends to be considered as the distinct species : Melitaea ignasiti.
 Melitaea trivia nana Staudinger, 1871
 Melitaea trivia nativa Tuzov, 2000
 Melitaea trivia petri Shchetkin, 1984
 Melitaea trivia singularia Korshunov, 1995
 Melitaea trivia uvarovi Gorbunov, 1995

Common names 
In German: Braunlicher Scheckenfalter
In French: Mélitée du bouillon-blanc
In English: Lesser Spotted Fritillary or Desert Fritillary

References

External links
Butterflies of Europe 
 AdaMerOs-Butterflies of Turkey

Melitaea
Butterflies of Europe
Butterflies described in 1775